Atlantis III: The New World, (known as Beyond Atlantis II in North America), is a 2001 fantasy adventure video game developed and published by Cryo Interactive, with Dreamcatcher Interactive publishing the game in North America. David Rhodes composed the musical score. It is the third game in the Atlantis series by Cryo, as well as the last one made before Cryo's closure. It was followed by Atlantis Evolution in 2004.

Plot
The player is a young Egyptologist looking for a city in the desert.

Gameplay
The game is a third-person, point-and-click adventure.

Reception 

Market research firm PC Data reported that Atlantis III sold 10,200 retail units in North America for 2001, and 24,927 during the first six months of 2002. Its retail sales in the region for 2003 totaled 7,637 units. The combined global sales of Atlantis III and its predecessors, Atlantis and Atlantis II, surpassed 1 million units by 2004. According to review aggregation website Metacritic, the game received "generally favorable reviews" from critics.

Staci Krause of IGN positively compared the game to Schizm and Road to India, praising its storyline as being both well developed and engaging. Ron Dulin of GameSpot thought that the game lacked any sense of narrative cohesion, and instead focused on visually appealing environments and interesting puzzles. Absolute Games gave the game a rating of 60%.

Atlantis III was a nominee for GameSpot's 2001 "Best Adventure Game" award, which ultimately went to Myst III: Exile. The editors wrote: "Beyond Atlantis II is full of strange puzzles and metaphysical gobbledygook. But the constant barrage of strangeness actually works in the game's favor".

See also
Riddle of the Sphinx: An Egyptian Adventure
Schizm: Mysterious Journey

References

External links 

2001 video games
Android (operating system) games
Atlantis in fiction
Atlantis (video game series)
Cryo Interactive games
First-person adventure games
IOS games
PlayStation 2 games
Point-and-click adventure games
The Adventure Company games
Video game sequels
Video games developed in France
Video games featuring female protagonists
Video games set in Algeria
Video games set in Egypt
Windows games